Dennis Baino (born 12 January 1975) is a Surinamese former footballer who played at both professional and international levels as a midfielder.

Career
Baino played club football in Suriname, Belgium and the Netherlands for Transvaal, Verbroedering Denderhoutem, Cappellen, KV Wevelgem City, Tournai, KSV Rumbeke and USV Elinkwijk.

He was also a member of the Suriname national team between 1996 and 2004, appearing in three FIFA World Cup qualifying matches.

Managing career 

In January 2016, it was announced that Baino signed a 2-year contract with SV Transvaal. His first official match was in 'De Klassieker'(the El Clasico of Suriname) between SV Robinhood and SV Transvaal. Baino reached the 2nd place with Transvaal in the season of 2016/17. On 29 January 2017, the board of Transvaal decided to replace Baino, because after 8 games played in the new Topklasse league, he failed to keep the club in mid table . Baino went on to become the manager of Inter Moengotapoe and winning the Topklasse, later he became the manager of the Surinamese Under 15 side.

Managing Honours 
2017 – Champion of Topklasse with Inter Moengotapoe

References

Living people
1975 births
Surinamese expatriate footballers
Surinamese footballers
Suriname international footballers
S.V. Transvaal players
Expatriate footballers in the Netherlands
Expatriate footballers in Belgium
Surinamese expatriate sportspeople in the Netherlands
Surinamese expatriate sportspeople in Belgium
USV Elinkwijk players
Royal Cappellen F.C. players
SVB Eerste Divisie players
Surinamese football managers
Association football midfielders